Antipterna nivea is a species of moth in the family Oecophoridae, first described by Alfred Jefferis Turner in 1940 as Ocystola nivea. The species epithet, nivea, derives from the Latin adjective, niveus ("snow-white").  The male lectotype for Ocystola nivea was collected at Warwick in Queensland.

Further reading

References

Oecophorinae
Taxa described in 1940
Taxa named by Alfred Jefferis Turner